Golden is a ghost town in Burt County, Nebraska, United States.

History
A post office was established at Golden in 1894, and remained in operation until it was discontinued in 1900.

References

Geography of Burt County, Nebraska